James Hardiman (1782–1855), also known as Séamus Ó hArgadáin, was a librarian at Queen's College, Galway.

Hardiman is best remembered for his History of the Town and County of Galway (1820) and Irish Minstrelsy (1831), one of the first published collections of Irish poetry and songs.

The National University of Ireland, Galway (formerly Queen's College Galway) 
library now bears his name. Hardiman Road in Drumcondra, Dublin is named after him.

Biography
Hardiman was born in Westport, County Mayo, in the west of Ireland around 1782. His father owned a small estate in County Mayo. He was trained as a lawyer and became sub-commissioner of public records in Dublin Castle. He was an active member of the Royal Irish Academy, and collected and rescued many examples of Irish traditional music.

In 1855, shortly after its foundation, Hardiman became librarian of Queen's College, Galway.

Eponyms
The National University of Ireland, Galway (formerly Queen's College Galway) library was named in his honour.

Hardiman Road in Drumcondra, Dublin is named after him.

The Hardiman hotel in Galway is named after him.

Works
The History of the Town and County of the Town of Galway. From the Earliest Period to the Present Time (Dublin: W. Folds & Sons, 1820); reprint Galway: Connacht Tribune Printing and Publishing Co., 1958; second impression (of reprint): same publisher, 1985. Online in English
Ancient Irish Deeds and Writing, Chiefly Relating to Landed Property, from the Twelfth to the Seventeenth Century (Dublin: Graisberry, 1828)
Irish Minstrelsy, or Bardic Remains of Ireland, with English Poetical Translations (London: J. Robins, 1831); reprint Shannon: Irish University Press, 1971; .

References

External links
NUI Galway library

1782 births
1855 deaths
19th-century Irish people
19th-century Irish historians
Irish librarians
Irish writers
Members of the Royal Irish Academy
People associated with the University of Galway
People from County Mayo
People from County Galway